The Campbellford Rebels are a Canadian Junior ice hockey team based in Campbellford, Ontario, Canada.  They play in the Tod Division of the Provincial Junior Hockey League, and were formerly members of the Empire B Junior C Hockey League of the Ontario Hockey Association.

History
Campbellford's junior hockey history began in 1980.  The Campbellford Merchants joined the Quinte-St. Lawrence Junior C Hockey League.

In 1986, the Quinte-St. Lawrence league was falling apart and merged with the more western Central Ontario Junior C Hockey League.  The Merchants and most of the other local teams, like the Frankford Huskies, were forced into hiatus.

In 1989, The Eastern Ontario Junior C Hockey League was formed in the same region as the Quinte-St. Lawrence League.  In 1992, the Campbellford Rebels were formed to compete in the new league. The first goal in Rebels history was scored by Marc Emmons on October 7, 1992.  In 1995, the Eastern Ontario Junior C Hockey League became the Empire B Junior C Hockey League to stifle confusion between the league and the neighbouring Ottawa District Hockey Association's Eastern Ontario Junior C Hockey League.

Success for the Rebels began in 1996.  The Rebels won the 1997, 1998, and 2000 league championships.  After disappointment in 2001 and 2002, the Rebels were again victorious in 2003 and 2004.  With five league championships in eight years, the Rebels have yet to win the Clarence Schmalz Cup as All-Ontario Champions.

The Rebels finished third overall in the 2005-06 regular season.  Because of a new divisionary system in the league, despite finishing the season with a losing record, the Rebels finished first in their division and received a bye to the league semi-final.    In the semi-final, the Rebels drew the Amherstview Jets who beat Campbellford 4-games-to-1.

The Rebels ended up in fourth place in the 2006-07 final standings.  Barely sneaking in on the final playoff spot, the Rebels came up against the top seeded Colborne Cobras who polished off Campbellford 4-games-to-none to move on to the league final.

Campbellford had a great 2011-12 season and ended up in the league final vs the defending champions Picton Pirates.  The Rebels upset the Pirates to win the Empire B Championship.  In the provincials they advanced for the first time past the QF defeating the Clarington Eagles of the Central Ontario League in seven games.  Then the Rebels surprised everyone by winning the first three games of their SF vs the powerful Alliston Hornets of the Georgian Bay Mid Ontario League.  The Hornets sting came out in game 4 and the Rebels epi pen couldn't save them after that.  Alliston came back to win the series in 7 games.

The playoffs for the 2019-20 season were cancelled due to the COVID-19 pandemic, leading to the team not being able to play a single game.

Season-by-season results

External links
Campbellford Rebels

Empire Junior C Hockey League teams
1992 establishments in Ontario
Ice hockey clubs established in 1992